Beth Israel is a Reform congregation and Jewish synagogue in Portland, Oregon, United States. The congregation was founded in 1858, while Oregon was still a territory, and built its first synagogue in 1859.

Architecture

The congregation's first building was a modest, single story, pitched-roof, wood-framed, clapboard building with Gothic, pointed-arch windows and door.

This early structure was replaced by an 1889 synagogue building, which was destroyed by fire in December 1923. Designed by Portland architect Warren H. Williams, the building, called Moorish revival design in some sources, is elsewhere described as a combination of eclectic and Gothic revival styles, with two towers topped by bulbous domes. The Oregonian newspaper in 1923 described its style as "semi-Gothic and Mooresque". It was located at S.W. 12th and Main streets in downtown Portland.

It was replaced in 1928 by a notable Neo-Byzantine synagogue building at N.W. 19th and Flanders that continues to serve the congregation. It was listed as Temple Beth Israel on the National Register of Historic Places in 1979. Designed by Herman Brookman, it is considered one of the finest examples of Byzantine-style architecture on the west coast, and was inspired by the Alte Synagoge (Steelerstrasse Synagogue) in Essen, Germany.

See also
Beth Israel Cemetery (Portland, Oregon)
Oregon Jewish Museum, houses the historical records of Congregation Beth Israel

References

External links

Congregation Beth Israel (official website)

Ashkenazi Jewish culture in the United States
Ashkenazi synagogues
Religious buildings and structures in Portland, Oregon
Jews and Judaism in Portland, Oregon
Byzantine Revival synagogues
Properties of religious function on the National Register of Historic Places in Oregon
Synagogues on the National Register of Historic Places
Byzantine Revival architecture in Oregon
Reform synagogues in Oregon
Synagogue buildings with domes
National Register of Historic Places in Portland, Oregon
1928 establishments in Oregon
Herman Brookman buildings
Northwest District, Portland, Oregon
Moorish Revival synagogues
Moorish Revival architecture in the United States